The Young Country is a 1970 American Western television film written and directed by Roy Huggins (creator of TV's Maverick). It starred Walter Brennan, Joan Hackett, Wally Cox, Pete Duel and Roger Davis. It was aired on 17 March 1970 in the ABC Movie of the Week strand. It was televised in the UK on 1 May 1970 and was shown in Japan, Spain, South Korea and the Philippines.

Made as a pilot for a potential series, The Young Country was about con artists in the Old West. TV Guide describes The Young Country as a lighthearted Western, where a footloose young gambler is searching for the owner of a mysterious fortune.

Stephen Foster Moody (Roger Davis of TV's Dark Shadows) is "a serious student" of gambling, takes a personal oath to spend the rest of his life avoiding "hard liquor and hard work" after doing hitches in both the Union and Confederate armies. Aarom Grimes (Wally Cox) is a thief who robs a bank. They and other various interested parties set about finding the said mysterious fortune.

The Young Country was rejected as a series by ABC; however, they broadcast it as an ABC Movie of the Week. Roy Huggins went on to develop the pilot for Alias Smith and Jones, which ABC accepted and was turned into a series of the same name. This series followed the adventures of two reformed outlaws, who in character were not dissimilar to those played by Pete Duel and Roger Davis in The Young Country.

Cast
 Walter Brennan as Sheriff Matt Fenley
 Joan Hackett as Clementine Hale
 Wally Cox as Aaron Grimes / Ira Greebe
 Pete Duel as Honest John Smith
 Roger Davis as Stephen Foster Moody
 Skip Young as Desk clerk
 Steve Sandor as Parker
 Elliott Street as R.R. ticket clerk
 Robert Miller Driscoll as Harvey 'Fat' Chance

References

External links
 

1970 television films
1970s English-language films
1970 Western (genre) films
ABC Movie of the Week
American Western (genre) television films